Remembering the Moment is a live album by David Friesen, Eddie Moore, Jim Pepper, Julian Priester and Mal Waldron recorded in Portland, Oregon in 1987 and released on the Italian Soul Note label.

Reception
The Allmusic review by Scott Yanow awarded the album 4 stars stating "An all-star quintet really gets an opportunity to stretch out on this date... Although there are not many explosive moments and few surprises, the playing is at a consistently high level, particularly when one considers that Pepper and Priester had never before played with some of the members of the rhythm section."

Track listing 
 "Autumn Leaves" (Joseph Kosma, Johnny Mercer, Jacques Prévert) – 22:05
 "A Night in Tunisia" (Dizzy Gillespie) – 23:21
 "All Blues" (Miles Davis) – 21:34

Personnel 
David Friesen – double bass
Eddie Moore – drums
Jim Pepper – tenor saxophone
Julian Priester – trombone
Mal Waldron – piano

References 

1994 live albums
Mal Waldron albums
Black Saint/Soul Note albums
David Friesen albums